Janette Manrara Škorjanec (born November 16, 1983) is a singer, Cuban-American television presenter, choreographer and professional dancer from Miami, Florida, US. Born to her Cuban parents  Luis and Maritza, Janette is the oldest of three. Originally a singer, learning from her Cuban family, she formally studied dance from the age of 19. Manrara is best known for her appearances on the US series So You Think You Can Dance and British dance reality television competition, Strictly Come Dancing. She is married to Slovenian dancer and co-star Aljaž Škorjanec. In June 2021, it was announced that Manrara would co host Strictly Come Dancing: It Takes Two with Rylan Clark.

Personal life
Manrara began performing in musical theatre at age 12, and started her formal dance training at 19, studying ballroom, ballet, pointe, jazz and hip-hop. Manrara studied finance at Florida International University whilst completing her dance training.

In 2015, Manrara became engaged to long time partner, Strictly Come Dancing and Burn the Floor co-star, Aljaž Škorjanec. They were married on 15 July 2017.

In February 2023, Janette and Aljaz announced that they are expecting their first child in late summer 2023

So You Think You Can Dance

Manrara originally auditioned for So You Think You Can Dance but failed to make it through to the top 20. She auditioned again in season 5, performing a lap dance and made it through to the top 20, where she was paired with contemporary dancer Brandon Bryant. Like Manrara, Bryant had come through Las Vegas week during Season 4 only to be cut during the Top 20 selection.  During her time on the show, Janette received much praise from the judges; both Mia Michaels and Nigel Lythgoe said Janette was their favorite female dancer that season and Lythgoe went on to say he hoped she would win the entire competition. An Argentine Tango she performed with Bryant was the first dance on Season 5 to receive a standing ovation from the judges. However, Manrara was eliminated during week 7 along with contemporary dancer Jason Glover.

During the show's eighth season, Manrara returned as an All Star to perform a Paso Doble with contestant Marko Germar.

Strictly Come Dancing and It Takes Two

Highest and lowest scoring performances per dance

Melvin Odoom is the only celebrity not to appear on this list.

In 2013 Manrara became a professional dancer on British TV show Strictly Come Dancing. Her first celebrity partner in the 11th series was fashion designer Julien Macdonald; they were the third couple to be eliminated. She returned for the 12th series and partnered actor Jake Wood, with whom she made it to the Semi-Finals and finished in 5th place overall. For the 13th series, she was paired with TV personality Peter Andre; they were the 9th couple to be eliminated. As well as her main series appearances Manrara has also taken part in one-off specials of the show. In 2013 she performed a Quickstep with actor Ricky Norwood on the Christmas special. In 2014 Manrara scored a maximum of 40 points in 'The People's Strictly for Comic Relief'  for an American Smooth with, 'Kidz R us' founder, Phillip Barnett. Manrara took part in the 2016 'Strictly Come dancing Live tour''' with her series 12 partner Jake Wood. For series 14, she was partnered with radio DJ Melvin Odoom. They were the first couple to be eliminated after receiving the fewest public votes, there was no dance off due to fellow competitor Anastacia's injury. Odoom and Manrara reprised their partnership in the 2016 Christmas special, she also danced with canoeist Joe Clarke in the 2016 Children in Need special. For series 15, she was partnered with former JLS singer Aston Merrygold. They were the sixth couple eliminated in week 7, losing the dance-off to Mollie King and her partner AJ Pritchard. For series 16, she was partnered with children's television and This Morning doctor Dr. Ranj Singh. They were the sixth couple to be eliminated. During her seventh series on the show, in 2019, she was partnered with paralympian, Will Bayley. They had to withdraw from the competition on week 7, after Will sustained a knee injury in rehearsals the previous week. For her eighth series, she was partnered with pop singer, HRVY, where she reached the final for the first time and came runner-up. With HRVY, she also holds the record for the earliest perfect score for their Street/Commercial routine in week 6.

On 10 June 2021, it was announced that Manrara would become the new presenter of Strictly Come Dancing: It Takes Two, taking over from Zoe Ball who stepped down from the series earlier in the year. Manrara therefore did not continue as a professional dancer on the show.

Strictly Come Dancing performances

Series 11
For series 11, Manrara was paired with Julien Macdonald.

Series 12
For series 12, Manrara was paired with Jake Wood.

*In week three Guest Judge, Donny Osmond, gave Jake and Janette 8 extra points

Series 13
For series 13, Manrara was paired with Peter Andre.

Series 14
For series 14, Manrara was paired with Melvin Odoom.

Series 15
For series 15, Manrara was paired with Aston Merrygold.

*In week 5, Bruno Tonioli was not present, so scores were out of 30

Series 16
For series 16, Manrara was paired with Dr. Ranj Singh.

Series 17
For series 17, Manrara was paired with Paralympic table tennis player Will Bayley.

The couple's Contemporary dance, to Lukas Graham's song "7 Years", was dedicated to the patients and staff at Great Ormond Street Hospital, where Bayley had been treated for cancer, aged seven. Michael Hogan of The Daily Telegraph said the pair "... didn't leave a dry eye in the house after their beautiful, barefoot contemporary dance."

Due to a knee injury sustained during studio rehearsals, Bayley was unable to perform in week 6 (Halloween Week). On 30 October it was confirmed that he had withdrawn from the competition.

 Alfonso Ribeiro filled in for Tonioli

Series 18
For series 18, Manrara was paired with HRVY.
Due to the COVID-19 pandemic all scores are out of 30 as only  three judges of the 4 Judges were present. This was the first series that Manrara got her first ever perfect score, also the first perfect score in Week 6. Plus, it was her first ever Final since she first joined the show in 2013.

 Dance tours and other professional engagements 
In July 2022, Manrara announced she would be teaching & performing with Aljaž Škorjanec at Donahey's Dancing with The Stars Weekends in 2023.

In 2020 Manrara and Aljaž Škorjanec announced dates for their 2021 UK Tour "Remembering The Oscars"

In 2018, Manrara & Aljaž Škorjanec announced dates for their 2019 UK Tour 'Remembering The Movies'.

Janette took part in the national Strictly Come Dancing - The Live Tour in 2017.

 Other projects 
Following her appearance on So You Think You Can Dance, Manrara joined musical TV series, Glee as a principal dancer. She also made her "Burn the Floor - West End" debut at the Shaftesbury Theatre in London on 21 July 2010. Additionally, she was part of the Burn the Floor'' US cast, which toured the United States from late 2010 through May 2011. She also appears on the BBC One show Morning Live doing a fitness workout. She has also co presented the show.

References

1983 births
Living people
So You Think You Can Dance (American TV series) contestants
21st-century American dancers
People from Florida
American people of Cuban descent
American expatriates in England